Flatraket is a small village in Stad Municipality in Vestland county, Norway. Flatraket has a good view of the island of Silda and the Stadlandet peninsula. The population (2001) of Flatraket was 306.

Traditionally, fishing and agriculture have been important for this village, and the largest business there now is AS Fiskevegn. Flatraket has a school, a kindergarten, and a grocery store.

References

Stad, Norway
Villages in Vestland